The giant bronze gecko (Ailuronyx trachygaster) is a species of lizard in the family Gekkonidae endemic to Seychelles.

Its natural habitats are subtropical or tropical dry forests and subtropical or tropical moist lowland forests.
It is threatened by habitat loss.

References

Fauna of Seychelles
Ailuronyx
Endemic fauna of Seychelles
Reptiles described in 1851
Taxa named by André Marie Constant Duméril
Taxonomy articles created by Polbot